Tzitzipandáquare was the fifth Cazonci of the Irechikwa Ts'intsuntsani in Mesoamerica, in what is now Mexico. He ruled from 1454 to 1479. Under his rule, the nation conquered parts of the Aztec Empire, up to Jiquipilco.

References 
15th-century monarchs in North America
Purépecha people